Marika Lichter (Vienna, 24 October 1949) is an Austrian singer and actress who was popular as a pop singer in the early 1970s, before moving into musicals and acting. Her career experienced a revival from 2006 with Dancing Stars.

Discography 
Singles
 "Adieu" (1969)
 Ich hab einem Kummer (1970)
 Wieder / Tu nicht so (1970)
 Ungeküßt / Männer sind so
 Dann wird es wieder schön sein / Allein
 CD Musik ist Trumpf (2006) nur 3 Titel: Musik ist Trumpf / Spiel noch einmal für mich, Habannero / Tipipipitipso

References

1949 births
Living people